The Ministry of Transport of the Russian Federation is a ministry of the Government of Russia responsible for transportation. 

The Ministry of Transport oversees road transport, railroads, commercial aviation, sea transport, inland waterway transport, and urban metro systems in Russia. The ministry develops public policies and legal regulations, and also oversees the surveying, mapping, and naming of geographic features. The Ministry of Transport is headquartered in Meshchansky District, Moscow.

The Ministry of Transport was created in 1809 as the Ministry of Railway Transport of the Russian Empire and later became the People's Commissariat for Railways of the USSR. It was reformed into the Ministry of Railways in 1946 and later expanded its authority to become the Ministry of Transport of the USSR. It was re-established as the Ministry of Transport of the Russian Soviet Federative Socialist Republic after the collapse of the Soviet Union in 1991 and received its current name when the state was renamed to the Russian Federation on December 25, 1991. The Ministry of Transport was combined with the Ministry of Communications and Information for a brief period as short-lived Ministry of Transport and Communications from 9 March to 20 May 2004.

Vitaly Savelyev has been the Minister of Transport since 10 November 2020.

Subordinate agencies
Federal Service for Supervision of Transport ("Rostransnadzor"; Федеральная служба по надзору в сфере транспорта, Ространснадзор). Formed in 2004.
Federal Air Transport Agency (FATA) ("Rosaviatsia"; Федеральное агентство воздушного транспорта, Росавиация). Formed in 1964 as Ministry for Civil Air Transport in Soviet Union, responsible for Inspection over the Civil Air Transport. Previous names: Department for Air Transport under the Transportation Ministry (1991-1995), Federal Air Service (1996-1998), Federal Service for Air Transport (1999), State Service for Civil Aviation (2000-2003), Since 2004 is carrying the current name.
Federal Road Agency ("Rosavtodor"; Федеральное дорожное агентство, Росавтодор)
Federal Rail Transport Agency ("Roszheldor"; Федеральное агентство железнодорожного транспорта), formed in 2004 on basic of the previous Railways Ministry which was dissolved.
Federal Agency for Maritime and River Transportation ("Rosmorrechflot"; Федеральное агентство морского и речного транспорта, Росморречфлот).

Ministers of Transport of the Russian Federation

See also

Transport in Russia
Rail transport in Russia

References

External links
Ministry of Transport official website 
Legal acts of the Ministry of Transport  

Organizations based in Moscow
Russia
Transport
1990 establishments in Russia
Transport organizations based in Russia